St Albans is a suburb in Melbourne, Victoria, Australia,  north-west of Melbourne's Central Business District, located within the City of Brimbank local government area. St Albans recorded a population of 38,042 at the 2021 census.

St Albans' main commercial and shopping precinct is located on Main Road West, Main Road East, Alfrieda Street, the railway station and East Esplanade. It has become one of Melbourne's most multicultural suburbs, with only 32.5% of residents being born in Australia and has a very high proportion of residents of a non-English speaking background. The postcode is 3021.

History

St Albans was first established as a township in 1887 and originally subdivided by the Cosmopolitan Land and Banking Company, who had acquired  in the hope of a quick financial gain during that period's land boom. Manager Alfred Padley made an arrangement with Victorian Railways to build the railway station, which he insisted be named St Albans after his maternal ancestors' association with St Albans Cathedral, England. Padley built and resided in Kieglo, which later became the Presbytery of the Sacred Heart . The company was later liquidated in 1903.

St Albans was promoted as an attractive location for professionals, providing easy rail access to central Melbourne and adjoining suburbs. St Albans Post Office opened on 22 October 1888. 

St Albans became a small dormitory suburb for growing industrial firms in Deer Park and Sunshine. Despite the Great Depression, development was steady and, by 1940, around 700 people lived in the town. In the years following World War II, the population rapidly increased with the arrival of displaced migrants, particularly from Yugoslavia, Malta and Italy. This led to additional state schools and the 1953 establishment of Sacred Heart Catholic Church, as well as Greek, Russian and Serbian Orthodox churches.

St Albans remained geographically isolated from other suburbs by large areas of open land until the 1980s.

Demographics

St Albans' ethnic makeup is predominantly first and second generation immigrants. The ABS 2021 Census reported that 30% were of South-East Asian origin, with large Vietnam extraction.

Since the 2001 Census, there has also been a rapid increase in the number of refugees from the Horn of Africa settling in St Albans.

In the 2021 census the population of St Albans was 38,042, approximately 50.3% female and 49.7% male.

The median/average age of the people in St Albans is 36 years of age.

32.5% of people living in the suburb of St Albans were born in Australia. The other top responses for country of birth were 21.5% Vietnam, 5.8% India, 3.0% Philippines, 2.7% Malta, 1.4% Iraq, 1.4% Croatia, 1.4% Pakistan, 1.3% North Macedonia.

21.6% of people living in St Albans speak English only. The other top languages spoken are 29.2% Vietnamese, 4.2% Punjabi, 2.7% Maltese, 2.4% Cantonese, 2.1% Arabic.

The most common religions in St Albans are 25.6% Catholic, 19.7% No religion, 15.6% Buddhism, 5.9% Islam, 4.6% Eastern Orthodox.

Transport

Trains
St Albans has three train stations, all in PTV ticketing Zone 2 on the Sunbury line. These are Ginifer, St Albans and Keilor Plains.

The line was electrified as far as St Albans until 26 January 2002 when it was extended to Sydenham. The Sydenham line was electrified to Sunbury and renamed the Sunbury railway line, opening on 18 November 2012.

The level crossing at St Albans station was removed in 2016, with the station lowered and the level crossing replaced with a new overpass.

Buses
St Albans has numerous bus services that service St Albans itself and neighboring suburbs, most of which start and finish at St Albans railway station.

Cycling
Cyclists in St Albans are represented by BrimBUG, the Brimbank Bicycle User Group.

Flora and fauna

Great parks are located on the East and West borders of the suburb. These areas (particularly in the West) used to have large healthy populations of native reptiles, including Tiger snake, Eastern blue-tongued lizard and Eastern brown snake. Unfortunately due to development these species are now rarely seen in the area.

Due to development of the Cairnlea estate on the southern border of St Albans, native species of frogs have taken advantage and have taken up residence in the new wetlands and lakes. The Eastern Banjo Frog, common eastern froglet and even the now endangered growling grass frog have been seen and heard in the new wetlands and around Kororoit Creek.

 Brimbank Park
 Kororoit Creek Trail

Education

St Albans has a large number of schools including the following;

 Victoria University, Australia
 Victoria University Secondary College
 Catholic Regional College St Albans
 Holy Eucharist Primary School
 St Albans Secondary College
 St Albans Primary School (established 1889)
 St Albans Heights Primary School
 St Albans East Primary School
 St Albans Meadows Primary School
 University Park Primary School (formerly St Albans South Primary School)
 St Albans North Primary School
 Sacred Heart Primary School
 Stevensville Primary School
 Movelle Primary School
 Copperfield College
 Jackson School

Community facilities

The suburb and surrounding areas have a large Orthodox Christian community. The suburb is home to the Greek Orthodox Church of St Paraskevi, St Barbara and St John the Merciful, the Serbian Orthodox Church of St George, and also the Coptic Orthodox Church of St George.

Thien Duc Temple, Dieu Am Temple and Bo De Temple, three Vietnamese Buddhist temples, are located in the suburb.

Sport

The suburb has an Australian Rules football team, St Albans Football Club, competing in the Western Region Football League, with the club actually based in neighbouring Kings Park. The club has been very successful particularly over recent years.

The local soccer team, the St Albans Saints is backed by the Croatian community, whilst the Green Gully Cavaliers are backed by the Maltese community. Both currently compete in the Victorian Premier League and both have significant support.

See also
 City of Keilor – Parts of St Albans were previously within this former local government area.
 City of Sunshine – Parts of St Albans were previously within this former local government area.
 History of St Albans web site – a web site maintained by local historians that is still a work in progress
 St Albans railway station, Melbourne

References

Suburbs of Melbourne
Suburbs of the City of Brimbank